is a station on the Toyama Chihō Railway Toyamakō Line in Toyama, Japan.

Railway stations in Toyama Prefecture